Mattamy Homes is a Canadian home builder, founded in Toronto by Peter Gilgan in 1978. One of the largest privately owned builders in North America, Mattamy Homes is Canada's largest residential home builder and top-25 builder in the United States. 

The company's name is a portmanteau of the names of Gilgan's two oldest children, Matt and Amy.

Markets
Most of Mattamy Homes' projects have been in the Greater Toronto Area and Ottawa, but has also built homes in Calgary, Edmonton, Waterloo Region and multiple markets in the United States.

Notable neighbourhoods and communities developed by Mattamy Homes include:

 Hawthorne Village, Milton, Ontario
 Mattamy on Main, Whitchurch-Stouffville, Ontario
 Berczy Village, Markham, Ontario
 Parkside Towns at Saturday in Downsview Park, North York, Toronto, Ontario
 Wellen Park, North Port, Florida

Mattamy is currently working with industry leading developers Minto Group, Fieldgate Developments, Dellray Group, Delpark Homes, Cortellucci Group, Tercot Communities, Sorbara Group, and Tribute Communities on developing North Brooklin, Ontario.

Philanthropy
In 2011, Peter Gilgan donated $15 million to Ryerson University. The money was used to create the Mattamy Athletic Centre on the upper level of Maple Leaf Gardens.

In 2013, Gilgan donated $40 million to the development of The Hospital for Sick Children Centre for Research and Learning.

In 2015, Gilgan donated $5-million to Parks Foundation Calgary to be used for the development of a 138-kilometre ring of paved pathways around the city. The creation of the Rotary/Mattamy Greenway began in 2010 and was completed in 2017.

In North Port, Florida, Mattamy donated  of land along with $4.7 million towards the development of the new CoolToday Park, a ballpark and spring training complex for the Atlanta Braves which opened March 24, 2019 against the Tampa Bay Rays.

In 2019, Gilgan donated $100 million to The Hospital for Sick Children in Toronto, making Gilgan the largest health care benefactor in Canada at the time.

In 2022, Gilgan donated $105 million to Trillium Health Partners to build the "Peter Gilgan Mississauga Hospital" and to expand the existing Queensway Health Centre. The donation was the largest donation to a hospital in Canadian history.

Controversies
Prior to the 2018 Ontario general election, Mattamy Homes donated $100,000 to Ontario Proud, a right-wing political advocacy group which used television ads and Facebook to support Doug Ford and the Progressive Conservative Party of Ontario.  Of the $460,000 raised by Ontario Proud, most was donated by developers "who wanted Ford to ease environmental rules for housing developments". The donation, controversial due to Ontario's recent prohibition of political donations to candidates from corporations, was the subject of broad media coverage, including in the CBC, Global News, and the Globe and Mail, and the legitimacy of the donation was questioned by the Canadian Medical Association Journal. Mattamy was forced to release a public statement addressing the donation, and pledged to make no contributions to political advocacy groups in the future. In 2019, Mattamy was fined $25,000 by the city of Guelph for 78 charges of illegal tree cutting on a lot in the south end of the city.

See also
Maple Leaf Gardens
Mattamy National Cycling Centre

References

Real estate companies of Canada
1978 establishments in Ontario
Companies based in Oakville, Ontario